Put Yourself in My Place may refer to:

Put Yourself in My Place (album), by Pam Tillis, 1991
"Put Yourself in My Place" (Pam Tillis song), the title song
"Put Yourself in My Place" (Kylie Minogue song), 1994
"Put Yourself in My Place" (Motown song), recorded by four Motown acts 1965–1966
"Put Yourself in My Place", a song by the Hollies from Hollies, 1965